Saeid Mohammadfar (born 2 January 1995) is an Iranian footballer who plays as a right back who currently plays for Iranian club Saipa in the Persian Gulf Pro League.

Club career

Pars Jonoubi Jam
He made his debut for Pars Jonoubi Jam in 7th fixtures of 2017–18 Iran Pro League against Saipa.

References

1995 births
Living people
Iranian footballers
Pars Jonoubi Jam players
Association football defenders
People from Qaem Shahr
Sportspeople from Mazandaran province
21st-century Iranian people